The NPB–KBO Club Championship  was contested between the champions of Nippon Professional Baseball's Japan Series, and the Korea Baseball Organization's Korean Series. The Korean teams lost to Japan in both matches of 2009 and 2010.

Game results

See also
 Asia Series
 CPBL–KBO Club Championship
 Korean Series
 Japan Series

References

 
International baseball competitions in Asia